Bay Miwok (Saclan, Saklan) was one of the Miwok languages spoken in California, around San Francisco Bay. All of the population has shifted to English.

References

External links 
 Saclan at the Survey of California and Other Indian Languages
 Saclan, California Language Archive
 OLAC resources in and about the Bay Miwok language

Miwok
Utian languages
Extinct languages of North America
History of the San Francisco Bay Area